The following is a list of Essendon Football Club leading goalkickers in each season of the Australian Football League (formerly the Victorian Football League).

References
Essendon Club Honours

Goalkickers
Essendon Football Club goalkickers
Essendon Football Club goalkickers